Patrick Kayemba is a Ugandan politician and diplomat. He is a member of the African Union's Economic, Social and Cultural Council representing East Africa . He is also Chairman of the Rural Economy and Agriculture Committee, one of the ten Sectoral Cluster Committees of the African Union.

Economic, Social and Cultural Council Standing Committee members
Ugandan politicians
Living people
Ugandan diplomats
Year of birth missing (living people)